The Old Davidson County Courthouse is a historic courthouse building located at Lexington, Davidson County, North Carolina.  It was built in 1858, and is a two-story, gable front stuccoed stone temple-form building.  It features a prostyle hexastyle portico, with fluted Roman Corinthian order columns. Above the portico is an octagonal clock tower. It was remodeled in 1918.  Most county offices moved to a new courthouse built in 1959.

The building houses the Davidson County Historical Museum and was rededicated in 2014.

It was added to the National Register of Historic Places in 1971.  It is located in the Uptown Lexington Historic District.

References

External links
Davidson County Historical Museum

Clock towers in North Carolina
County courthouses in North Carolina
Historic American Buildings Survey in North Carolina
Courthouses on the National Register of Historic Places in North Carolina
Neoclassical architecture in North Carolina
Government buildings completed in 1858
Museums in Davidson County, North Carolina
National Register of Historic Places in Davidson County, North Carolina
Individually listed contributing properties to historic districts on the National Register in North Carolina